John McPhedran (born 17 September 1949) is a Canadian wrestler. He competed in the men's Greco-Roman 68 kg at the 1976 Summer Olympics.

References

1949 births
Living people
Canadian male sport wrestlers
Olympic wrestlers of Canada
Wrestlers at the 1976 Summer Olympics
People from Centre Wellington
Pan American Games medalists in wrestling
Pan American Games bronze medalists for Canada
Wrestlers at the 1975 Pan American Games
20th-century Canadian people